Florewood State Park, also known as Florewood River Plantation State Park, is a closed public recreation area in the U.S. state of Mississippi. The state park is located off U.S. Highway 82 on the western edge of Greenwood.

History
The park originated in 1973 when the Moor family deeded property to the state of Mississippi for use as a "living historical plantation." In 2005, a bill introduced before the Mississippi Legislature authorized the disposal of Florewood Plantation State Park and four other state parks. An auction company offered the "entirety of Florewood River Plantation State Park" at auction on July 23, 2005. Although the department intended to keep the park open as a day-use facility with "picnic pavilions and picnic tables," the park was leased to Leflore County in 2007.

As of 2016, the park was described as "temporarily closed due to renovation" by the Mississippi Department of Wildlife, Fisheries, and Parks. The 2015-2016 edition of Mississippi Outdoor Digest listed the park as operated by Leflore County and temporarily closed.

References

External links
Florewood State Park Mississippi Department of Wildlife, Fisheries, and Parks

State parks of Mississippi
Protected areas of Leflore County, Mississippi
1973 establishments in Mississippi